Riders of the Desert is a 1932 American Western film directed by Robert North Bradbury and written by Wellyn Totman. The film stars Bob Steele, Gertrude Messinger, Al St. John, George "Gabby" Hayes, John Elliott and Horace B. Carpenter. The film was released on April 24, 1932, by Sono Art-World Wide Pictures.

Cast           
Bob Steele as Bob Houston
Gertrude Messinger as Barbara Reynolds
Al St. John as Slim 
George "Gabby" Hayes as Hashknife Brooks
John Elliott as Houston
Horace B. Carpenter as Capt. Jim Reynolds
Joe Dominguez as Gomez 
Greg Whitespear as Apache Joe 
Louise Carver as Buck Lawlor
Tex O'Neill as Cochimo

References

External links
 

1932 films
1930s English-language films
American Western (genre) films
1932 Western (genre) films
Films directed by Robert N. Bradbury
American black-and-white films
1930s American films